Rhizopogonaceae are a family of fungi in the order Boletales. The family, first named and described by botanists Ernst Albert Gäumann and Carroll William Dodge in 1928, contains 2 genera and 151 species. The genus Fevansia, formerly thought to belong in the Rhizopogonaceae, was found to belong in the Albatrellaceae in a molecular phylogenetics study.

References

 
Rhizopogonaceae
Taxa named by Carroll William Dodge